Muhammad Osman El-Sayed (28 February 1930 – 21 April 2013) was a flyweight Greco-Roman wrestler from Egypt who won a silver medal at the 1960 Olympics.

References

External links
Osman El-Sayed's profile at the Egyptian Ministry of Youth and Sport 
Osman El-Sayed's obituary 

1930 births
2013 deaths
Olympic wrestlers of Egypt
Wrestlers at the 1960 Summer Olympics
Egyptian male sport wrestlers
Olympic silver medalists for Egypt
Olympic medalists in wrestling
Medalists at the 1960 Summer Olympics
20th-century Egyptian people